Ivan Semyonovich Zhevakhov, also known as Ivane Simonis dze Javakhishvili (1762 – July 24, 1837) was a Georgian nobleman and a general of the Imperial Russian Army. 
Zhevakhov is known for his participation in the Napoleonic Wars and the Russo-Turkish War (1787–1792) at the Siege of Ochakov (1789).

Family
Zhevakhov was born in the émigré Georgian family of Prince Simon Javakhishvili who had an estate in Ukraine. He had at least one brother, Filipp, who participated in the conquest of Crimea and was a recipient of the Order of St. Anna. Ivan's branch of the Javakhishvili family originally moved out of Georgia to Russia in the 1730s at the invitation of the exiled Georgian monarch Vakhtang VI.

Career

Zhevakhov joined the military service as a cadet of the Ukrainian hussar regiment in 1775 and received his first major military experience in fighting with the Trans-Kubanian Circassians in 1777. He then fought in the Russo-Turkish War (1787–1792) and was wounded when storming Ochakov in 1789. Having fought in Poland in 1792, Zhevakhov was promoted to colonel in 1800 and then participated in the wars against Napoleonic France from 1805 to 1807.

During the 1812 French invasion of Russia, he commanded the Serpukhov dragoon regiment within the 3rd Army of the West and contributed to the Russian success in the July 1812 battles of Kobryn and Gorodechna, which halted the French advance toward Kiev. He then led cavalry regiments in Osten-Sacken’s corps and participated in the 1813-14 campaign against Napoleon. On April 8, 1813, he was promoted to the rank of major-general. Zhevakhov resigned due to health problems in 1817 and henceforth lived in Odessa where he died in 1837.

See also
 Pyotr Bagration
 Lev Mikhailovich Yashvil

References 

1762 births
1837 deaths
Russian people of Georgian descent
Nobility of Georgia (country)
Imperial Russian Army generals
Georgian generals in the Imperial Russian Army
Georgian major generals (Imperial Russia)
Russian commanders of the Napoleonic Wars